Birgir Ármannsson (born 12 June 1968 in Reykjavík) is a member of parliament of the Althing, the Icelandic parliament. He is a member of the Independence Party. He was educated at the University of Iceland and King's College London. Since 2021, he is the Speaker of the Althing.

External links
Althing biography

1968 births
Living people
Alumni of King's College London
Birgir Armannsson
21st-century Icelandic politicians
Birgir Armannsson
Birgir Armannsson
Birgir Armannsson
Birgir Armannsson
Politicians from Reykjavík